Timiș may refer to:

Timiș County, a county in western Romania
Timiș (river), a river in western Romania and Serbia
Ținutul Timiș, a former administrative unit of Romania
Temes County, a former administrative county (comitatus) in the historic Kingdom of Hungary
Timiș-Torontal County, a former county in the historic Kingdom of Romania
Timiș-Cerna Gap, a mountain pass in south-western Romania
Slatina-Timiș, a commune in Caraș-Severin County, Romania
Timiș (Olt), a tributary of the Olt River in central Romania
Canalul Timiș, a canal linking the Timiș and the Ghimbășel rivers in Romania
Frank Timiș (born 1965), Romanian-Australian businessman living in London
Timiș 2, a series of tramcars built by the Timișoara Transport and Tram Carriage Construction Company

See also
Timișoara, a city in western Romania, in Timiș County
Timișu de Jos, a village in Brașov County on the Timiș valley
Timișu de Sus, a village also in Brașov County on the Timiș valley
Timișana, a tributary of the Timiș River
Timișul Mort River, a tributary of the Timiș River
Timișel River, a tributary of the Bega River